Birbalomys is an extinct genus of rodent from Asia.

Birbalomys have a definite likeness with the ctenodactyloid families, Chapattimyidae and Yuomyidae. Early findings suggest that Birbalomys were found in the Subathu Formation in the Kuthar River in the Eocene period.

References

Eocene mammals of Asia
Eocene rodents